Robert Esseldeurs (born 1948), stage name Danny Fabry, is a Flemish singer. He had various charting singles in English and Dutch through the 1980s and 1990s. He was married to singer Conny Fabry, but they divorced in the early nineties. After his music career, he operated a restaurant in Scherpenheuvel, which he sold in 2001. Ça c'est la vie en De telefoon.

References

1948 births
Living people
Dutch-language singers of Belgium
English-language singers from Belgium
20th-century Belgian male singers
20th-century Belgian singers
Date of birth missing (living people)
Place of birth missing (living people)